The Sidewise Awards for Alternate History were established in 1995 to recognize the best alternate history stories and novels of the year.

Overview
The awards take their name from the 1934 short story "Sidewise in Time" by Murray Leinster, in which a strange storm causes portions of Earth to swap places with their analogs from other timelines.

The awards were created by Steven H Silver, Evelyn C. Leeper, and Robert B. Schmunk. Over the years, the number of judges has fluctuated between three and eight and have included judges in the United States, United Kingdom, Canada and South Africa.

Two awards are normally presented each year, usually at WorldCon or at  NASFiC. The Short-Form award is presented to a work under 60,000 words in length. The Long-Form award is presented to a work or works longer than 60,000 words, which may include a single novel or a multi-volume series. The judges have four times also recognized an individual with a Special Achievement Award in recognition for works published prior to the award's inception or for other contributions to the genre.

Award winners

Long Form
1995 – Paul J. McAuley, Pasquale's Angel
1996 – Stephen Baxter, Voyage
1997 – Harry Turtledove, How Few Remain
1998 – Stephen Fry, Making History
1999 – Brendan DuBois, Resurrection Day
2000 – Mary Gentle, Ash: A Secret History
2001 – J. N. Stroyar, The Children's War
2002 – (tie): Martin J. Gidron (name since changed to Martin Berman-Gorvine), The Severed Wing & Harry Turtledove, Ruled Britannia
2003 – Murray Davies, Collaborator
2004 – Philip Roth, The Plot Against America
2005 – Ian R. MacLeod, The Summer Isles 
2006 – Charles Stross, The Family Trade, The Hidden Family, and The Clan Corporate
2007 – Michael Chabon, The Yiddish Policemen's Union
2008 – Chris Roberson, The Dragon's Nine Sons
2009 – Robert Conroy, 1942
2010 – Eric G. Swedin, When Angels Wept: A What-If History of the Cuban Missile Crisis
2011 – Ian R. MacLeod, Wake Up and Dream
2012 – C. J. Sansom, Dominion
2013 – (tie) D. J. Taylor, The Windsor Faction & Bryce Zabel, Surrounded by Enemies: What If Kennedy Survived Dallas?
2014 – Kristine Kathryn Rusch, The Enemy Within
2015 – Julie Mayhew, The Big Lie
2016 – Ben H. Winters, Underground Airlines
2017 – Bryce Zabel, Once There Was a Way
2018 – Mary Robinette Kowal, The Calculating Stars
2019 – Annalee Newitz, The Future of Another Timeline
2020 – Adrian Tchaikovsky, The Doors of Eden
2021 – Laurent Binet, Civilizations (translated by Sam Taylor)

Short Form
1995 – Stephen Baxter, "Brigantia's Angels"
1996 – Walter Jon Williams, "Foreign Devils" (in War of the Worlds: Global Dispatches)
1997 – William Sanders, "The Undiscovered"
1998 – Ian R. MacLeod, The Summer Isles
1999 – Alain Bergeron, "The Eighth Register" (translated by Howard Scott)
2000 – Ted Chiang, "Seventy-Two Letters"
2001 – Ken MacLeod, The Human Front
2002 – William Sanders, "Empire"
2003 – Chris Roberson, "O One"
2004 – Warren Ellis, The Ministry of Space
2005 – Lois Tilton, "Pericles the Tyrant"
2006 – Gardner Dozois, "Counterfactual"
2007 – (tie): Michael Flynn, "Quaestiones Super Caelo Et Mundo" & Kristine Kathryn Rusch, "Recovering Apollo 8"
2008 – Mary Rosenblum, "Sacrifice"
2009 – Alastair Reynolds, "The Fixation"
2010 – Alan Smale, "A Clash of Eagles"
2011 – Lisa Goldstein, "Paradise Is a Walled Garden"
2012 – Rick Wilber, "Something Real"'
2013 – Vylar Kaftan, "The Weight of the Sunrise"
2014 – Ken Liu, "The Long Haul: From the Annals of Transportation, The Pacific Monthly, May 2009"
2015 – Bill Crider, "It Doesn't Matter Anymore"
2016 – (tie): Daniel M. Bensen, "Treasure Fleet" & Adam Rovner, "What If the Jewish State Had Been Established in East Africa"
2017 – Harry Turtledove, "Zigeuner"
2018 – Oscar (Xiu) Ramirez and Emmanuel Valtierra, Codex Valtierra
2019 – Harry Turtledove, "Christmas Truce"
2020 – Matthew Kresal, "Moonshot"
2021 – Alan Smale, "Gunpowder Treason"

Special Achievement
1995 – L. Sprague de Camp, lifetime achievement
1997 – Robert Sobel, For Want of a Nail
1999 – Randall Garrett, the Lord Darcy series
2018 – Eric Flint, for support of writers in the alternative history genre, most notably via the 1632 series

References

External links
 The Sidewise Award website

Alternate history
Alternate history fandom
Awards established in 1995
Science fiction awards